Michael B. Stuart (born August 31, 1980) is an American former professional ice hockey player who last played for Lørenskog of the Norwegian Eliteserien. Mike is the brother of Mark Stuart and Colin Stuart, and is the son of Mayo Clinic physician Michael Stuart.

Playing career
He was drafted by the Nashville Predators in 5th round, 137th overall in the 2000 NHL Entry Draft and played 3 games for the St. Louis Blues.

Career statistics

Regular season and playoffs

International

References

External links

1980 births
Living people
Alaska Aces (ECHL) players
American men's ice hockey defensemen
Colorado College Tigers men's ice hockey players
Graz 99ers players
Ice hockey players from Minnesota
Lørenskog IK players
Nashville Predators draft picks
Peoria Rivermen (AHL) players
Rochester Mustangs players
St. Louis Blues players
Sportspeople from Rochester, Minnesota
Stuart family
Worcester IceCats players